David Becker (born 20 October 1961) is an American jazz guitarist and leader of the David Becker Tribune. He is also a graduate of the Musicians Institute.

Career
David and his brother Bruce (drummer) formed the David Becker Tribune and toured Germany in 1984. After touring the colleges that same year, the band signed with MCA and released its debut album Long Peter Madsen in 1986. In 1988, Siberian Express (MCA), produced with Ken Caillat was released and reached No. 3 on R&R and the track "Anja" reached No. 1. This was followed in 1990 and 1991 by two albums, Third Time Around and In Motion.

In 2001, the band released one of the first DVD-Audio recordings, Germerica. Some of the tracks were co-produced by drummer Mark Schulman. In 2004, Where's Henning reached No. 34 on the JazzWeek chart. A solo album, Euroland, and a duo with jazz guitarist Joe Diorio, The Color of Sound (Acoustic Music), followed in 2005.

Batavia was released world wide on August 6, 2010 to coincide with the 65th anniversary of the dropping of the atom bomb in Japan. The compositions were influenced by Becker's mother's family in Indonesia and their internment in a Japanese concentration camp during World War II. Batavia was voted one of the Best World Music recordings of 2010 by World Music Central.org. In 2013 Distance Traveled was released and reached No. 18 on the CMJ charts. In July 2015, Becker released the solo album The Lonely Road (Acoustic Music Records). In 2018, Becker recorded a duo outing with former Ray Charles guitarist, Brad Rabuchin as a tribute to the late guitarist John Abercrombie. For John was released in June 2019. A new book of 25 Guitar Etudes penned by Becker, Etudes You Can Use, was released in March 2021. In August of 2021, Becker joined drummer Chris Bowman (Ornette Coleman) and bassist Jim Donica ( Maynard Ferguson) to record a improvised set of music. The album, Continuum was released August 7, 2022. 
Becker also released a new solo recording, Planets in October 2022.

Other projects
At the 2015 Winter NAMM show,  Heritage Guitars unveiled the David Becker H- 575 Signature model.

Becker also appears on the Colbie Caillat album, Breakthrough as well as her album All of You. He produced an Attila Zoller tribute album released by Enja in 2015. The album includes Ron Carter, Pat Metheny, Mike Stern, and John Abercrombie. In September 2019, Becker appeared in a podcast together with Country legend Vince Gill.

Discography
The David Becker Tribune
Long Peter Madsen (1986)
 Siberian Express (1988)
 Third Time Around (1990)
 In Motion (1991)
 Nevsky Prospekt (1995)
 Germerica (2001)
 Where's Henning? (2004)
 Euroland (2005)
 The Color of Sound (2005)
 Leaving Argentina (2007)
 Batavia (2010)
 Distance Traveled (2013)
 The Lonely Road (2015)
 Sounds of the World (2015)
 Kiwi Dreams (2018)
 For John (2019)
 Continuum (2022)
 Planets (2022)

Books/DVDs
2005: Getting Your Improvising Into Shape (Mel Bay)
2010: Playing in Shapes (Fingerprint)
2013: Rhythmic Motifs for Comping and Soloing (Fingerprint)
2015: Transitions to Jazz (Truefire)
2021: Etudes You Can Use'' (DBT)

References

External links
 Official website

1961 births
Living people
American jazz guitarists
Musicians from Cincinnati
Musicians Institute alumni
Guitarists from Ohio
American male guitarists
20th-century American guitarists
Jazz musicians from Ohio
20th-century American male musicians
American male jazz musicians
21st-century American guitarists
21st-century American male musicians